2007 EP is the debut EP from Phoenix, Arizona pop rock band This Century. It was released on October 5, 2007, and contains 6 tracks.

Track listing

Personnel
Members
 Joel Kanitz – Vocals
 Sean Silverman – Guitar
 Alex Silverman – Bass, keyboard
 Ryan Gose – Drums

References

External links 
 iTunes | 2007 EP
 Spotify | 2007 EP
 

2007 debut EPs